Kenansville is a town in Duplin County, North Carolina, United States. Its population was 855 at the 2010 census. It is the county seat of Duplin County. The town was named for James Kenan, a member of the North Carolina Senate, whose family home Liberty Hall Plantation is in Kenansville.

History
The Needham Whitfield Herring House and Kenansville Historic District are listed on the National Register of Historic Places.

Geography
Kenansville is located slightly west of the center of Duplin County at  (34.962119, -77.965658). North Carolina Highways 11 and 50 pass through the center of town, while North Carolina Highway 24 bypasses the town as a four-lane highway to the southeast. NC 24 leads southwest  to Interstate 40 at Exit 373 and east  to Jacksonville. NC 11 leads northeast  to Kinston and south  to Wallace, while NC 50 leads southeast  to Holly Ridge and west  to Warsaw.

Demographics

2020 census

As of the 2020 United States census, there were 770 people, 411 households, and 236 families residing in the town.

2000 census
As of the census of 2000, there were 1,149 people, 281 households, and 180 families residing in the town. The population density was 609.5 people per square mile (234.7/km2). There were 314 housing units at an average density of 166.6 per square mile (64.1/km2). The racial makeup of the town was 51.35% White, 45.95% African American, 0.26% Native American, 0.44% Asian, 1.83% from other races, and 0.17% from two or more races. Hispanic or Latino of any race were 2.70% of the population.

There were 281 households, out of which 22.4% had children under the age of 18 living with them, 50.2% were married couples living together, 10.7% had a female householder with no husband present, and 35.6% were non-families. 32.7% of all households were made up of individuals, and 17.4% had someone living alone who was 65 years of age or older. The average household size was 2.25 and the average family size was 2.83.

In the town, the population was spread out, with 11.8% under the age of 18, 8.2% from 18 to 24, 35.7% from 25 to 44, 21.3% from 45 to 64, and 23.0% who were 65 years of age or older. The median age was 42 years. For every 100 females, there were 167.2 males. For every 100 females age 18 and over, there were 167.3 males.

The median income for a household in the town was $36,053, and the median income for a family was $41,307. Males had a median income of $27,917 versus $23,021 for females. The per capita income for the town was $11,933. About 11.9% of families and 28.5% of the population were below the poverty line, including 11.3% of those under age 18 and 56.9% of those age 65 or over.

Cultural resources

The Cowan Museum has artifacts from the early rural heritage of North Carolina and Duplin County. Also located in Kenansville is Liberty Hall Restoration, the ancestral home of the Kenan family after whom the town was named.

References

External links
 Town of Kenansville official website
 Cowan Museum

Towns in Duplin County, North Carolina
Towns in North Carolina
County seats in North Carolina